Zborówek may refer to:

Zborówek, Lesser Poland Voivodeship, a village in the administrative district of Gmina Biskupice, Wieliczka County, Lesser Poland Voivodeship, Poland
Zborówek, Świętokrzyskie Voivodeship, a village in the administrative district of Gmina Pacanów, Busko County, Świętokrzyskie Voivodeship, Poland
Zborówek Nowy, a village in the administrative district of Gmina Pacanów, Poland